I'm Not There is a 2007 musical drama film directed by Todd Haynes, and co-written by Haynes and Oren Moverman. It is an unconventional biographical film inspired by the life and music of American singer-songwriter Bob Dylan. Six actors depict different facets of Dylan's public personas: Christian Bale, Cate Blanchett, Marcus Carl Franklin, Richard Gere, Heath Ledger (his final film to be released during his lifetime), and Ben Whishaw. A caption at the start of the film declares it to be "inspired by the music and the many lives of Bob Dylan"; this is the only mention of Dylan in the film apart from song credits, and his only appearance in it is concert footage from 1966 shown during the film's final moments.

I'm Not There tells its story using non-traditional narrative techniques, intercutting the storylines of seven different Dylan-inspired characters. The title of the film is taken from the 1967 Dylan Basement Tape recording of "I'm Not There", a song that had not been officially released until it appeared on the film's soundtrack album. The film received a generally favorable response for its acting, directing, and musical score, and appeared on several top ten films lists for 2007, topping the lists for The Village Voice, Entertainment Weekly, Salon, and The Boston Globe. Particular praise went to Cate Blanchett for her performance, culminating in a Volpi Cup for Best Actress from the Venice Film Festival, the Golden Globe Award for Best Supporting Actress, along with an Academy Award for Best Supporting Actress nomination.

Plot
I'm Not There uses a nonlinear narrative, shifting between six characters in separate storylines "inspired by the music and many lives of Bob Dylan". Each character represents a different facet of Dylan's public persona: poet (Arthur Rimbaud), prophet (Jack Rollins/Father John), outlaw (Billy McCarty), fake (Woody Guthrie), "rock and roll martyr" (Jude Quinn), and "star of electricity" (Robbie Clark).

Production notes published by distributor The Weinstein Company explain that the film "dramatizes the life and music of Bob Dylan as a series of shifting personae, each performed by a different actor—poet, prophet, outlaw, fake, star of electricity, rock and roll martyr, born-again Christian—seven identities braided together, seven organs pumping through one life story."

Arthur Rimbaud
19-year-old Arthur Rimbaud is questioned by interrogators. His cryptic responses are interspersed throughout the film, including remarks on fatalism, the nature of poets, "seven simple rules for life in hiding," and chaos.

Woody Guthrie
In 1959, an 11-year-old African American boy calling himself Woody Guthrie is freighthopping through the Midwestern United States. Carrying a guitar in a case bearing the slogan "this machine kills fascists", he plays blues music and sings about topics such as trade unionism. One African American woman advises him to sing about the issues of his own time instead. Woody is attacked by hobos and nearly drowns, but is rescued by a white couple who take him in. They are impressed with his musical talents, but Woody runs off when they receive a telephone call from a juvenile corrections center in Minnesota telling them he is an escaped fugitive. Upon learning that the real Woody Guthrie is deathly ill, Dylan travels to New Jersey to visit Guthrie in the hospital.

Jack Rollins/Father John
The career of folk musician Jack Rollins is framed as a documentary film, told by interviewees including folk singer Alice Fabian. Jack becomes a star of the Greenwich Village folk scene in the early 1960s, praised by fans for his protest songs. He signs to Columbia Records, but in 1963, just as the Vietnam War is escalating, he stops singing protest songs and turns away from folk music, believing that neither affects real social or political change. Following the assassination of John F. Kennedy, Jack gets drunk at a ceremony where he is receiving an award from a civil rights organization. Remarking in his acceptance speech that he saw something of himself in Kennedy's assassin Lee Harvey Oswald, he is booed and derided by the audience. He goes into hiding, and in 1974 enters a bible study course in Stockton, California, and emerges a born again Christian, denouncing his past and becoming an ordained minister performing gospel music under the name "Father John".

Robbie Clark
Robbie Clark is a 22-year-old actor who plays Jack Rollins in the 1965 biographical film Grain of Sand. During filming in Greenwich Village in January 1964, he falls in love with French artist Claire, and they soon marry. Grain of Sand is a hit and Robbie becomes a star, but their relationship is strained and Claire observes Robbie flirting with other women. She is particularly offended when, during an argument in 1968 over whether the evils of the world can be changed, he opines that women can never be poets. Eventually Robbie moves out of their house, then goes to London for four months to film a thriller and has an affair with his female co-star. Richard Nixon's January 1973 announcement of the Paris Peace Accords inspires Claire to ask for a divorce. She gains custody of their two daughters, but allows Robbie to take them on a boating trip.

Jude Quinn
Jude Quinn is a popular former folk singer whose performance with a full band and electric guitars at a New England jazz and folk festival outrages his fans, who accuse him of selling out. Travelling to London, Jude is asked by journalist Keenan Jones if he has become disillusioned or thinks folk music has failed to achieve its goals of sociopolitical change. Jude is attacked by a hotel employee, hangs out with the Beatles, encounters his former lover Coco Rivington, and meets poet Allen Ginsberg, who suggests that Jude "sold out to God." Interviewing Jude, Keenan notes that Jude's songs are being used as recruitment tools by the Black Panther Party and opines that Jude refuses to feel deeply about anything while simultaneously being very self-conscious; Jude is offended and walks out of the interview. At a concert performing "Ballad of a Thin Man", Jude is booed and called a "Judas" by the audience. Keenan reveals on television that, despite his claims of a rough-and-tumble vagabond past, Jude is actually Aaron Jacob Edelstein, the suburban, middle-class, educated son of a Brookline, Massachusetts department store owner. Faced with a long string of upcoming European tour dates, Jude spirals into drug use and is killed in a motorcycle accident.

Billy McCarty
Outlaw Billy McCarty, believed to have been killed by Pat Garrett, lives in hiding in rural Riddle, Missouri. Learning that Commissioner Garrett plans to demolish the town to build a highway, which has caused several townspeople to commit suicide, Billy confronts Garrett. Garrett recognizes Billy as the outlaw Billy the Kid and has him thrown in jail. He is broken out by his friend Homer and hops into a boxcar on a passing train, where he finds Woody's guitar. As he rides away, he remarks on the nature of freedom and identity.

The film concludes with footage of Dylan playing a harmonica solo during a live performance in 1966.

Cast

Main cast
These six characters represent different aspects of Dylan's life and music.
 Christian Bale as Jack Rollins/Pastor John. Jack Rollins depicts Dylan during his acoustic, "protest" phase which includes The Freewheelin' Bob Dylan and The Times They Are a-Changin'. Rollins's speech mentioning Lee Harvey Oswald quotes from a speech Dylan made when receiving the Tom Paine Award from the National Emergency Civil Liberties Committee in December 1963. Pastor John embodies Dylan's "born-again" period when he recorded Slow Train Coming and Saved.
 Cate Blanchett as Jude Quinn. Quinn "closely follows Dylan's mid-sixties adventures" and his "dangerous game propels him into existential breakdown." Quinn is an embodiment of Dylan in 1965–66, when he controversially played electric guitar at the Newport Folk Festival and toured the UK with a band and was booed. This phase of Dylan's life was documented by D. A. Pennebaker in the film Eat the Document. Quinn is seen at a folk festival performing a rock version of "Maggie's Farm" to outraged folk music fans; Dylan performed this song at the Newport Folk Festival in 1965, which provoked booing and controversy. Some of the questions Quinn is asked at a London press conference are quotes from Dylan's KQED press conference in San Francisco in December 1965. The sped-up film speed in the scene of Quinn gambolling with The Beatles echoes the style of Richard Lester's depiction in A Hard Day's Night. Quinn's reply, "How can I answer that if you've got the nerve to ask me?", to Bruce Greenwood's character comes from a similar response Dylan made to a reporter from Time magazine in Dont Look Back, Pennebaker's documentary about Dylan's 1965 English tour. The scene in which Jude is called "Judas" by an audience member is based on a May 17, 1966, concert in Manchester, captured on Dylan's album Live 1966. The Jude Quinn character's death reflects a serious motorcycle accident Dylan had in 1966.
 Marcus Carl Franklin as Woody. This character refers to Dylan's youthful obsession with folk singer Woody Guthrie. The slogan "This machine kills fascists" on Woody's guitar case mimics a label Guthrie famously had on his guitar.
 Richard Gere as Billy the Kid. Billy refers to Dylan playing the role of Alias in Sam Peckinpah's 1973 western Pat Garrett and Billy the Kid. The Billy character's final monologue in the film echoes remarks Dylan made in a 1997 interview with David Gates of Newsweek: "I don't think I'm tangible to myself. I mean, I think one thing today and I think another thing tomorrow. I change during the course of a day. I wake and I'm one person, and when I go to sleep I know for certain I'm somebody else. I don't know who I am most of the time. It doesn't even matter to me."
 Heath Ledger as Robbie Clark, an actor who portrays Jack Rollins in a biographical film and becomes as famous as the person he portrays; he experiences the stresses of a disintegrating marriage, reflecting Dylan's personal life around the time of 1975's Blood on the Tracks. The scene in which Robbie and Claire run romantically through the streets of New York re-enacts the cover of the 1963 album The Freewheelin' Bob Dylan which depicts Dylan arm in arm with his then-girlfriend Suze Rotolo in Greenwich Village. Dylan was divorced from his first wife, Sara Dylan, in June 1977 and the divorce involved court battles over the custody of their children. In his production notes, Haynes wrote that Robbie and Claire's relationship is "doomed to a long stubborn protraction (not unlike Vietnam, which it parallels)."
 Ben Whishaw as Arthur Rimbaud. Rimbaud is depicted as a man being questioned and responding with quotes from Dylan's interviews and writings. Dylan wrote in his autobiography Chronicles that he was influenced by Rimbaud's outlook.

Supporting cast
 Charlotte Gainsbourg as Claire Clark, wife of Robbie Clark (a representation of Sara Dylan and Suze Rotolo)
 David Cross as Allen Ginsberg
 Eugene Brotto as Peter Orlovsky
 Bruce Greenwood as Keenan Jones, a fictional reporter who investigates Jude Quinn, and Pat Garrett, nemesis of Billy the Kid. The name "Keenan Jones" echoes Dylan's song "Ballad of a Thin Man" with its chorus: "Something is happening here/ And you don't know what it is, do you Mr. Jones?" The character's revelation of Jude's past is based on a hostile profile of Dylan published in the October 1963 issue of Newsweek, revealing that he was originally named Robert Zimmerman and implying that he had lied about his middle-class origins.
 Julianne Moore as Alice Fabian, a singer who resembles Joan Baez
 Michelle Williams as Coco Rivington. The description of Rivington as "Andy's new bird" suggests this character is modelled on Edie Sedgwick, a socialite and actress within Andy Warhol's circle.
 Mark Camacho as Norman, the manager of Jude Quinn, based on Albert Grossman, Dylan's manager until 1970.
 Benz Antoine as Bobby Seale, the Black Panther leader, and Rabbit Brown
 Craig Thomas as Huey Newton, the Black Panther leader. Newton and Seale listened "obsessively" to Dylan's song "Ballad of a Thin Man" while putting together the first issue of the Black Panther newspaper in 1967.
 Richie Havens as Old Man Arvin
 Kim Roberts as Mrs. Arvin
 Kris Kristofferson as The Narrator
 Don Francks as Hobo Joe
 Vito DeFilippo and Susan Glover as Mr. and Mrs. Peacock, a middle-class couple who take "Woody Guthrie" in after a near-drowning incident
 Paul Spence as Homer, Billy the Kid's friend

Production

Development
Todd Haynes and his producer, Christine Vachon, approached Dylan's manager, Jeff Rosen, to obtain permission to use Dylan's music and to fictionalize elements of Dylan's life. Rosen suggested that Haynes should send a one-page synopsis of his film for submission to Dylan. Rosen advised Haynes not to use the word "genius" or "voice of a generation". The page Haynes submitted began with a quote from Arthur Rimbaud: "I is someone else", and then continued:

Dylan gave Haynes permission to proceed with his project. Haynes developed his screenplay with writer Oren Moverman. In the course of writing, Haynes has acknowledged that he became uncertain whether he could successfully carry off a film which deliberately confused biography with fantasy in such an extreme way. According to the account of the film that Robert Sullivan published in the New York Times: "Haynes called Jeff Rosen, Dylan's right hand, who was watching the deal-making but staying out of the scriptwriting. Rosen, he said, told him not to worry, that it was just his own crazy version of what Dylan is."

In a comment on why six actors were employed to portray different facets of Dylan's personality, Haynes wrote:

A further Dylan-based character named Charlie, based on Charlie Chaplin, was dropped before filming began. Haynes described him as "a little tramp, coming to Greenwich Village and performing feats of magic and being an arbiter of peace between the beats and the folkies."

Grain of Sand

The film within a film, Grain of Sand, is not only important for the plot of I'm Not There but also for the film's connection to Bob Dylan's life. Larry Gross suggests that Grain of Sand actor Robbie may be the film's most accurate portrayal of Dylan despite being "a fictional actor playing a fictional alternative version of a real person" because of his tumultuous relationship with Claire. Gross also notes parallels between Robbie and Claire's ultimately failed marriage and Dylan's relationship with Suze Rotolo, claiming that Claire's character seems to be a portrayal of Rotolo, especially considering the shot in I'm Not There that mimicks the photo of Rotolo and Dylan on the cover of The Freewheelin' Bob Dylan.

Filming
Principal photography took place in Montreal, Quebec, Canada. Music festival scenes were filmed in Chambly, Quebec in the summer of 2006.

Music

The film features numerous songs by Dylan, performed by Dylan and also recordings by other artists. The songs feature as both foreground—performed by artists on camera (e.g. "Goin' to Acapulco", "Pressing On")—and background accompaniment to the action. A notable non-Dylan song in the movie is "(I'm Not Your) Steppin' Stone" by The Monkees, which plays in the background of a party scene set in London.

Release
In January 2007, The Weinstein Company acquired U.S distribution rights to the film. I'm Not There had its world premiere at the Telluride Film Festival on August 31, 2007. The film went onto screen at the Toronto International Film Festival, London Film Festival, and the New York Film Festival. The film opened in limited release in the United States on November 21, 2007. It was then released in Germany on February 28, 2008, by Tobis Film.

Home media
I'm Not There was released on DVD as a 2-disc special edition on May 6, 2008. The DVD special features include audio commentary from Haynes, deleted scenes, featurettes, a music video, audition tapes for certain cast members, trailers, and a Bob Dylan filmography and discography.

Reception

Critical response
I'm Not There received generally positive reviews from critics. On review aggregator website Rotten Tomatoes, the film has a 77% approval rating based on 162 reviews, with an average rating of 7.06 out of 10. The site's critical consensus states: "I'm Not Theres unique editing, visuals, and multiple talented actors portraying Bob Dylan make for a deliciously unconventional experience. Each segment brings a new and fresh take on Dylan's life." On Metacritic, the film has a weighted average score of 73 out of 100, based on 35 reviews.

Writing in The Chronicle of Higher Education, Anthony DeCurtis wrote that casting six different actors, including a woman and an African-American child, to play Dylan was "a preposterous idea, the sort of self-consciously 'audacious'—or reassuringly multi-culti—gambit that, for instance, doomed the Broadway musical based on the life and music of John Lennon. Yet in I'm Not There, the strategy works brilliantly." He especially praised Blanchett:

Several other critics also praised Blanchett's performance as the mid-1960s Dylan. Newsweek magazine described Blanchett as "so convincing and intense that you shrink back in your seat when she fixes you with her gaze." The Charlotte Observer called Blanchett "miraculously close to the 1966 Dylan."

Todd McCarthy of Variety, concluded that the film was well-made, but was ultimately a speciality event for Dylan fans, with little mainstream appeal. He wrote: "Dylan freaks and scholars will have the most fun with I'm Not There, and there will inevitably be innumerable dissertations on the ways Haynes has both reflected and distorted reality, mined and manipulated the biographical record and otherwise had a field day with the essentials, as well as the esoterica, of Dylan's life. All of this will serve to inflate the film's significance by ignoring its lack of more general accessibility. In the end, it's a specialists' event." For Roger Ebert, the film was enjoyable cinematically, yet never sought to resolve the enigmas of Dylan's life and work: "Coming away from I'm Not There, we have, first of all, heard some great music ... We've seen six gifted actors challenged by playing facets of a complete man. We've seen a daring attempt at biography as collage. We've remained baffled by the Richard Gere cowboy sequence, which doesn't seem to know its purpose. And we have been left not one step closer to comprehending Bob Dylan, which is as it should be."

Dylan's response
In September 2012, Dylan commented on I'm Not There in an interview published in Rolling Stone. When journalist Mikal Gilmore asked Dylan whether he liked the film, he responded: "Yeah, I thought it was all right. Do you think that the director was worried that people would understand it or not? I don't think he cared one bit. I just think he wanted to make a good movie. I thought it looked good, and those actors were incredible."

Top ten lists
The film appeared on several critics' lists of the top ten films of 2007.

 1st – J. Hoberman, The Village Voice
 1st – Owen Gleiberman, Entertainment Weekly
 1st – Stephanie Zacharek, Salon
 1st – Ty Burr, The Boston Globe
 3rd – Lisa Schwarzbaum, Entertainment Weekly
 3rd – Marc Mohan, The Oregonian
 4th – A. O. Scott, The New York Times
 4th – Nathan Lee, The Village Voice
 4th – Shawn Levy, The Oregonian

 5th – Steven Rea, The Philadelphia Inquirer
 6th – Kevin Crust, Los Angeles Times
 7th – Marjorie Baumgarten, The Austin Chronicle
 9th – Glenn Kenny, Premiere
 9th – Peter Travers, Rolling Stone
 10th – Ann Hornaday, The Washington Post
 10th – Desson Thomson, The Washington Post
 10th – Keith Phipps, The A.V. Club
 10th – Tasha Robinson, The A.V. Club

Accolades
 Academy Awards:
 Best Supporting Actress (Cate Blanchett, nominee)
 British Academy Film Awards
 Best Actress in a Supporting Role (Cate Blanchett, nominee)
 Broadcast Film Critics:
 Best Supporting Actress (Cate Blanchett, nominee)
 Central Ohio Film Critics:
 Best Supporting Actress (Cate Blanchett, winner)
 Chicago Film Critics:
 Best Supporting Actress (Cate Blanchett, winner)
 Golden Globe Awards:
 Best Supporting Actress (Cate Blanchett, winner)
 Independent Spirit Awards
 Best Film (nominee)
 Best Director (Todd Haynes, nominee)
 Best Supporting Actor (Marcus Carl Franklin, nominee)
 Best Supporting Actress (Cate Blanchett, winner)
 Robert Altman Award (Todd Haynes, Laura Rosenthal, Christian Bale, Cate Blanchett, Marcus Carl Franklin, Charlotte Gainsbourg, Richard Gere, Bruce Greenwood, Heath Ledger and Ben Whishaw, winner)
 Las Vegas Film Critics:
 Best Supporting Actress (Cate Blanchett, winner)
 Los Angeles Film Critics:
 Best Supporting Actress (Cate Blanchett, runner-up)
 New York Film Critics Circle:
 Best Supporting Actress (Cate Blanchett, runner-up)
 New York Film Critics Online:
 Best Supporting Actress (Cate Blanchett, winner)
 National Society of Film Critics:
 Best Supporting Actress (Cate Blanchett, winner)
 Nilsson Awards for Film
 Best Supporting Actress (Cate Blanchett, winner)
 Best Cinematography
 Best Compiled Soundtrack
 Satellite Awards:
 Best Actress – Comedy or Musical (Cate Blanchett, nominee)
 Screen Actors Guild (SAG):
 Best Supporting Actress (Cate Blanchett, nominee)
 Southeastern Film Critics:
 Best Supporting Actress (Cate Blanchett, runner-up)
 Venice Film Festival:
 CinemAvvenire Award – Best Film (winner)
 Golden Lion (Todd Haynes, nominee)
 Special Jury Prize (Todd Haynes, winner)
 Volpi Cup Best Actress (Cate Blanchett, winner)

References

Sources

Further reading

External links

 
 
 "This Is Not a Bob Dylan Movie" (The New York Times)

2007 films
2007 biographical drama films
2000s musical drama films
American biographical drama films
American independent films
American musical drama films
American rock music films
Biographical films about musicians
Biographical musicals
Cultural depictions of Bob Dylan
Cultural depictions of the Beatles
Cultural depictions of Billy the Kid
Cultural depictions of Pat Garrett
Cultural depictions of Arthur Rimbaud
Cultural depictions of Woody Guthrie
2000s English-language films
Films about Bob Dylan
Films set in 1959
Films set in 1963
Films set in 1964
Films set in 1968
Films set in 1973
Films set in 1974
Films set in the United States
Films shot in Montreal
English-language German films
German biographical drama films
German musical drama films
German independent films
German rock music films
American nonlinear narrative films
Films with screenplays by Oren Moverman
Films directed by Todd Haynes
Films produced by Christine Vachon
Killer Films films
Films featuring a Best Supporting Actress Golden Globe-winning performance
Venice Grand Jury Prize winners
Films à clef
German nonlinear narrative films
2007 independent films
2007 drama films
2000s American films
2000s German films